Kelly Breen may refer to:

 Kelly J. Breen (born 1969), American horse trainer
 Kelly Breen (politician) (born 1977), American state legislator from Michigan